Hundested RK is a Danish rugby club in Hundested. They currently play in DRU Division One East.

History
The club was founded in 1985 by a teacher called Peter Rohde, who began teaching at the town's Storebjerg (Big Mountain) School. In the early years, the club had only junior teams, but started competing at senior level in 1988. This brought about a name change from Hundested Skole Rugby to Hundested Rugby Klub. They also got their own field in that same year, having played at Storebjerg School and various football fields prior to that.

Players

Current squad

References

External links
Hundested RK

Rugby clubs established in 1985
Danish rugby union teams
1985 establishments in Denmark